Boboci may refer to several villages in Romania:

 Boboci, a village in Dragodana Commune, Dâmboviţa County
 Boboci, a village in Jugureni Commune, Prahova County